Philip Riker III (born September 16, 1946) is an American former competition swimmer.

Riker represented the United States as an 18-year-old at the 1964 Summer Olympics in Tokyo.  He competed in the men's 200-meter butterfly, and finished fourth overall in the event final with a time of 2:11.0.

Riker attended the University of North Carolina at Chapel Hill, where he swam for the North Carolina Tar Heels swimming and diving team in National Collegiate Athletic Association (NCAA) competition from 1965 to 1967.

Riker won the NCAA National Championship in the 100 meter Butterfly in 1966.

See also
 List of University of North Carolina at Chapel Hill alumni
 List of University of North Carolina at Chapel Hill Olympians

References

External links
 
 

1946 births
Living people
American male butterfly swimmers
Lawrenceville School alumni
North Carolina Tar Heels men's swimmers
Olympic swimmers of the United States
Sportspeople from Passaic, New Jersey
Swimmers at the 1964 Summer Olympics
Universiade medalists in swimming
Universiade gold medalists for the United States